Natuagaon is a village in Morigaon district of Assam state of India.

References

Villages in Morigaon district